Antonio Marcucci (born 7 November 1937) is an Italian former wrestler. He competed in the men's freestyle light heavyweight at the 1960 Summer Olympics.

References

External links
 

1937 births
Living people
Italian male sport wrestlers
Olympic wrestlers of Italy
Wrestlers at the 1960 Summer Olympics
People from Faenza
Sportspeople from the Province of Ravenna